Fenestrapora is an extinct genus of bryozoans of the family Semicosciniidae that lived during the Devonian period. Its colonies have a net-like structure, shaped into a flaring funnel. It is distinct from most other fenestrate bryozoans due to its aviculomorphs, structures that are thought to have had the function of cleaning or defense.

References

Stenolaemata
Prehistoric bryozoan genera